The People of the State of California v. Superior Court (Decker), 41 Cal. 4th 1 (2007), is a criminal case decided by the Supreme Court of California that distinguished between solicitation and attempt.

Background
Decker searched out, asked, and later met with and paid an assassin to murder Decker's sister. After Decker made elaborate preparations, Decker had his final meeting with the assassin. "The assassin said, 'I want you to know, once I leave, its done. So you sure you want to go through with it?' Decker replied, 'I am absolutely, positively, 100 percent sure,'" then Decker handed over the money." The assassin was an undercover detective wearing a recording device.

Decker admitted he solicited murder, but denied he attempted murder, arguing that solicitation and attempt are not identical, with attempt having a standard of being much closer to the act intended to cause the consummation of the crime. The trial court agreed, and the attempt charge was dismissed for lack of evidence per its understanding of the law on elements of an attempt charge.

The prosecution appealed and the California Supreme Court reinstated the attempt charge. The court reasoned agreed that solicitation and attempt are different, and that solicitation does not imply attempt, the latter requiring a finding of greater proximity to fruition of the crime. But the court found that a jury might find the solicitation to have occurred at an earlier request to do the murder, and additionally find attempt at the time of the passing of the money.

Opinion of the Court
The Supreme Court wrote:

"Although Decker did not himself point a gun at his sister, he did aim at her an armed professional who had agreed to commit the murder... The solicitation is complete once the request is made... In this case the solicitation was complete early in Decker's first conversation with [the assassin] when he asked [the assassin] to kill [Decker's sister]... But the People do not contend that this request was sufficient to prosecute Decker for attempted murder. They argue instead that the solicitation, in combination with Decker's subsequent conduct... that Decker put this plan into operation no later than the point... at which he... paid [the assassin] $5,000...

"The issue is not whether solicitation alone is sufficient to establish an attempt, but whether a solicitation to commit murder, combined with a completed agreement to hire a professional killer and the making of a downpayment under that agreement, can establish probable cause to believe Decker attempted to murder... downpayment on a contract to murder... makes the object of the contract 'closer to fruition'."

References

2007 in United States case law
Attempt